Circulation Research is a biweekly peer-reviewed medical journal  published by Lippincott Williams & Wilkins. It is the official journal of the American Heart Association and its Council on Basic Cardiovascular Sciences. The journal covers research on all aspects of the cardiovascular system.

History 
The journal was established in 1953 by Carl J. Wiggers. The following people have been editor-in-chief:

Abstracting and indexing 
This journal is abstracted and indexed in:

According to the Journal Citation Reports, the journal has a 2018 impact factor of 15.862.

References

External links
 

Cardiology journals
English-language journals
Publications established in 1953
Lippincott Williams & Wilkins academic journals
Biweekly journals
American Heart Association academic journals